Larissa Queiroz (born August 24, 1984 in Rio de Janeiro) is a Brazilian actress.

Filmography

Television  
 1993 - Sonho Meu - Bruna
 1994 - Quatro por Quatro - Fabíola
 1995 - Você Decide - (episode: "O Motim")
 1995 - História de Amor - Larissa
 1997 - Por Amor - Juliana Fontes
 1999 - Chiquinha Gonzaga - Maria do Patrocínio Gonzaga do Amaral (child)
 1999 - Vila Madalena - Tamara
 2001 - Um Anjo Caiu do Céu - Luana
 2003 - Agora É que São Elas - Xica
 2004 - Senhora do Destino - Carolina (uncredited)
 2004 - Como uma Onda - Carol Lemos
 2007 - Paraíso Tropical - Rita
 2009 - Viver a Vida - Gilda (Gildinha)
 2011 - Insensato Coração - Selma Macedo (Selminha)
 2012 - Cheias de Charme - Elena

Cinema 

 2006 - The Ugly Duckling and Me! - Phyllis (Brazilian voice dubbing)

References

External links 

1984 births
Living people
Actresses from Rio de Janeiro (city)
Brazilian television actresses
Brazilian telenovela actresses